Hans Martinson (26 August 1872 Vana-Vändra Parish (now Põhja-Pärnumaa Parish), Kreis Pernau – 25 January 1935 Rapla) was an Estonian politician. He was a member of the III, IV and V Riigikogu. He was originally elected as a member of the Estonian Workers' Party, but during the III Riigikogu he switched to the Estonian Socialist Workers' Party, which he represented thereafter.

References

1872 births
1935 deaths
People from Põhja-Pärnumaa Parish
People from Kreis Pernau
Estonian Workers' Party politicians
Estonian Socialist Workers' Party politicians
Members of the Riigikogu, 1926–1929
Members of the Riigikogu, 1929–1932
Members of the Riigikogu, 1932–1934